The 2008 Central American and Caribbean Championships in Athletics were held at the Estadio Pedro Grajales in Cali, Colombia between 4–6 July 2008. A total of 44 events were contested, of which 22 by male and 22 by female athletes. During the three-day competition, six championship records were broken. The competition took place at almost 1000 m above sea level, a factor which helps athletic performance in some events.

Cuba took the most medals overall, winning 34 medals – half of which were gold. The hosts Colombia were the next best with 8 golds and 24 medals altogether, shortly followed by Trinidad and Tobago. Guest athletes took part in some events, but their performances were excluded from the medal tally.

Championship records were broken in both triple jump events; by Mabel Gay in the women's event and Leevan Sands in the men's. The championships also saw four national records broken in competition. Two athletes topped the podium twice: Rosibel García completed the 800 metres/1500 metres double, while Indira Terrero won in the 400 metres sprint and relay races. Bertha Sánchez, representing the hosts, took the 10,000 metres title, but just missed out on a second gold, winning the silver in the 5000 metres. Bahamian Shamar Sands showed multi-event ability by winning the 110 metres hurdles gold medal, as well as helping his country to the 100 m relay silver medal.

Records

Medal summary

Men

 † The 20 km racewalk event was won by Jefferson Pérez of Ecuador, who was competing as a guest athlete.

Women

 †† A Brazilian team of Rosemar Coelho Neto, Lucimar de Moura, Thaissa Presti and Franciela Krasucki took third place in the 4×100 m relay, but they were competing as guest athletes.
 ††† A Brazilian team of Maria Laura Almirão, Lucimar Teodoro, Josiane Tito and Emmily Pinheiro took second place in the 4×400 m relay, but they were competing as guest athletes.

Medal table

Participating nations

 (3)
 (1)
 (34)
 (10)
 (6)
* (8)
 (2)
 (7)
* (2)
 (54)
 (1)
 (41)
 (7)
 (27)
* (1)
 (5)
 (11)
 (4)
 (6)
 (2)
 (17)
 (26)
 (1)
 (3)
 (2)
 (24)
 (4)
 (10)
 (4)
 (5)
 (27)
 (6)
 (22)

* Guest nations

References
Results service Campeonato CAC de Atletismo 2008. AthleCAC. Retrieved on 2010-03-09.
Specific

External links
Official website

Central American and Caribbean Championships in Athletics
Central American and Caribbean Championships
Central American and Caribbean Championships
International athletics competitions hosted by Colombia